earthlings? is an album by earthlings? released in 1998 through Crippled Dick Hot Wax in Europe and Man's Ruin Records in the USA.

Track listing 
"Nothing" – 4:56
"Saving Up For My Spaceship / Illuminate" – 7:45
"Reaper (Don't Fear That Child)" – 5:21
"Cavalry" – 2:08
"Happiest Day of My Life" – 4:42
"Conversing Among Misfits" – 4:54
"Mars On Fire" – 3:24
"Stungun" – 3:00
"The Dreaded Lovelies" – 4:33
"Icy Halls Of Sobriety (I Dare Not Tread)" – 2:17
"Triumphant March Of The Buffoons" – 3:56

Personnel 
Dave Catching  – guitar
Pete Stahl  – vocals
Fred Drake  – bass
Adam Maples  – drums

References

Earthlings? albums
1998 albums